Holy Trinity Parish - designated for Polish immigrants in Lawrence, Massachusetts, United States.

 Founded 1905. It was one of the Polish-American Roman Catholic parishes in New England in the Archdiocese of Boston.

The parish closed November 1, 2004.

Bibliography 

 Our Lady of Czestochowa Parish - Centennial 1893-1993
 The Official Catholic Directory in USA

External links 

 Roman Catholic Archdiocese of Boston
 Closed and Merged Parishes

Roman Catholic parishes of Archdiocese of Boston
Polish-American Roman Catholic parishes in Massachusetts
1905 establishments in Massachusetts
2004 disestablishments in Massachusetts
Christian organizations established in 1905
Christian organizations disestablished in 2004